Ricky Harrell, Jr. (born March 7, 1987), professionally known as Ricky Racks, is an American record producer and songwriter. He is best known for production with well-known artists, most notably Young Thug, Young Scooter, Migos, and Lil Yachty.

Early life
Ricky Harrell, Jr. was born on March 7, 1986, in Greenville, North Carolina. As his father played guitar in a band called One-A-Chord, Racks' was introduced to music at a young age. While he learned the drums, he never considered being a musician, instead preferring sports such as basketball. Racks grew up listening to gospel, 90s RnB and rock, but discovered New York hip-hop himself as a teenager, listening to artists such as 50 Cent and Jay-Z. As Racks learned more about southern culture, he found himself gravitating to the more southern rap style of Yo Gotti and Gorilla Zoe. He began producing music between the ages of 16 and 17, but gave it up after four years without major success.

Career
Racks got back into music production when his friend gave him a computer. Racks had previously said to him that there was no money in music, but the friend liked Racks' demo CD of rap beats, and thought that Racks had potential. Stafa, another of Racks' friends and a sound engineer, had moved to Atlanta, the home of modern southern rap. In Atlanta, Stafa met DJ Holiday who asked for some demo beats for Rick Ross. After sending some of Racks' demos to DJ Holiday, Holiday was very interested in Racks, and offered to sign him. Racks moved to Atlanta on May 6, 2012. Racks connected with Atlanta rap group Migos through their uncle, who was a friend of Racks from Greenville. Racks' relationship with Migos would lead to production credits on their Culture and Culture II albums. He combines influences from east coast and southern hip hop.

Selected production discography

References

Living people
American hip hop record producers
1987 births